For Italian football transfers summer 2009 see the following articles:
List of Italian football transfers summer 2009 (co-ownership)
List of Italian football transfers summer 2009 (July)
List of Italian football transfers summer 2009 (August)

Tran
2009
Italy